MapInfo Pro is a desktop geographic information system (GIS) software product produced by Precisely (formerly: Pitney Bowes Software and MapInfo Corporation) and used for mapping and location analysis. MapInfo Pro allows users to visualize, analyze, edit, interpret, understand and output data to reveal relationships, patterns, and trends.  MapInfo Pro allows users to explore spatial data within a dataset, symbolize features, and create maps.

History 

Version 4 of the product, released in 1995, saw the product renamed to "MapInfo Professional".

Version 9.5 was released in June 2008.  Version 9.5.1 was released in December 2008.  The primary enhancements in these releases included the use of a new graphics engine which allows for translucency and anti-aliasing when displaying maps.  A set of CAD like editing tools were also added in this release.

Version 10 was released in June 2009. The primary enhancements included a more intuitive user interface, including a rewritten Layer Control dialog box, compatibility with PostGIS and a PDF generator that supports both Layered and georeference PDF files.

Version 10.5 was released in May 2010. The primary enhancements included a new Table Manager window, a built in ability to publish to MapInfo Stratus, ability to ingest Bing Maps directly as background mapping and enhanced support for Catalog Service for the Web (CSW).

Version 11 was released in June 2011. The primary enhancement included performance tuning and usability improvements on the Browser window for creating and analysing tabular data.  Integration with MapInfo Manager, a product for managing spatial data and providing [INSPIRE] compliance.  Support for 64 bit operating systems was improved with the ability to use up to 4 GB of RAM (instead of 2GB, the limit when running on 32 bit operating systems).

Version 11.5 was released in June 2012.  The primary enhancements include a new window for Creating Legends, further enhancements to the new Browser window (introduced in v11.0) and further integration with MapInfo Manager, including the ability to edit metadata within the Catalog Browser.

Version 12 was released in June 2013, with improvements to Cartographic Output; Support for Windows 8, SQL Server 2012, PostGIS2; and a new In-Product Notifications feature utilizing RSS.

Version 12.5 of MapInfo Pro was the first time that a 64 bit version of the product was introduced.  MapInfo Pro 12.5 32 bit was released in July 2014 and 64 bit in October 2014.  The 64 bit release saw the introduction of a new ribbon UI and layout window, as well allowing for a new framework to handle background processing and multi-threading.

Version 15 of MapInfo Pro 32 bit was released in June 2015 and 64 bit (15.2) was released in October 2015. Highlights include geopackage support as well as changes to the TAB file format to allow larger files and Unicode. The 64 bit version of 15.2 saw the introduction of MapInfo Pro Advanced as a new licensing level for the product which incorporates all new raster capabilities into the product including a .NET SDK.  MapInfo Pro Advanced allows users to visualize very large raster files at high resolution such as 1m for a whole country and incorporating multiple satellite bands.  This is achieved using a new multi resolution raster file format (.mrr).

Version 16 of MapInfo Pro 64 bit was released in September 2016. Notable features include redesigned Ribbon interface, new interactive interface for thematic mapping, WFS 2.0 and WMTS support, Geopackage support. All new 64-bit version of EasyLoader is included with the release.

Version 17.0 of MapInfo Pro 64 bit was released in April 2018. Python support was added.

Version 2019 of MapInfo Pro 64 bit was released in Nov 2019. Much extended SQL is a key new feature. The mother company is rebranded as Precisely by its new owner Syncsort.

Version 2021 of MapInfo Pro 64 bit was released in Oct 2021. Support for Time Series (mapping/visualizing geographic data changing over time) was added.

Uses 
MapInfo Pro is a 64-bit GIS (Geographic Information System) application used by GIS engineers and business analysts.   

Industry examples include: 
 Insurance – Analyze exposure to risk from environmental or natural hazards such as floods, tornadoes, hurricanes or crime.  Perform demographic and risk analysis to determine the best target  locations to acquire new potential policy holders. 
 Environment – Analyze and assess environmental impacts such as pollution, erosion, invasive species, climate changes including human induced changes to the environment.
 Engineering – Coordinate with local planning and engineering  groups for construction projects.  Assist related groups by helping them understand environmental     impacts or locations of public or utility infrastructure such as water, gas and electrical services.  
 Telco – Produce coverage maps, visualize gaps in coverage, plan for additional coverage.  Maximize new investment based on demographics, local terrain and available real estate for cell tower sites.  
 Marketing - The application of location intelligence to identify geographic areas in which to deliver marketing.
 Retail Site Selection  - Determining the optimum location to open or close a site (store, factory, depot etc.). The selection process is typically based on customers or worker location, demographics, buying patterns, transport links, nearby facilities.
 Crime Analysis - Systematic analysis of spatial data for identifying and analyzing patterns and trends in crime and disorder.
 Mineral Exploration - Visualisation of spatial data such as drill holes, soil samples, geophysical survey data, tenement boundaries and cadastral data.

System Features  

 Data Format  ---      
MapInfo Pro is a database which manages information as a system of Tables.  Each table is either a map file (graph) or a database file (text) and is denoted the file extension .TAB.  MapInfo creates a visual display of the data in the form of a map (map window) and/or tabular form (browser window).  Once data has been referenced in a table it is assigned X and Y coordinates so that the records can be displayed as objects on a map.  This is known as Geocoding.

Objects (points, lines, polygons) can be enhanced to highlight specific variations on a theme through the creation of a Thematic map.  The basic data is overlaid with graphic styles (e.g. colour shades, hatch patterns) to display information on a more sophisticated level.  For example, population density between urban and rural areas may show the cities in deep red (to indicate a high ratio of inhabitants per square mile), while showing remote areas in very pale red (to indicate a low concentration of inhabitants).

Retrieval of information is conducted using data filters and  "Query" functions .  Selecting an object in a map window or records in a browser produces a temporary table that provides a range of values specified by the end-user.  More advanced "Structured Query Language" (SQL) analysis allows the user to combine a variety of operations to derive answers to complex questions.   This may involve a combination of tables and resultant calculations may be such as the number of points in polygons, proportional overlaps, and statistical breakdowns.   The quantity and quality of the attributes associated with objects are dependent on the structure of the original tables.

Vector analysis is a primary function of MapInfo based on X, Y coordinates and the user can create and edit data directly with commands such as: node editing, combine, split, erase, buffer, clip region.  MapInfo Pro includes a range of engineering “CAD like” drawing and editing tools such as lines, circles, and polygons (referred to as "regions") which can be incorporated into tables or drawn as temporary overlays.

Printout of MapInfo maps and/or statistics is managed through design settings in the Layout Window.  Layout design enables the creation of composite presentations with maps, tables, legends, text, images, lines and shapes.  Output hardware includes large format plotters and high spec. business printers.
Data from MapInfo may be embedded into applications such as Microsoft PowerPoint or Word using copy/paste commands and resized as required.

 Compatibility with External Software Systems  ---
MapInfo Pro can read and write other file formats for data exchange with applications such as:
 ESRI Shapefile and AutoCAD DXF
 CSV and delimited ASCII text
 Microsoft Excel and Microsoft Access
 Bitmaps or Raster Formats such as GeoTIFF, ECW, Mr. SID, JPEG, PNG, MRR
 Spatial Databases:  Oracle, PostGIS, SQL Server, SQLite and GeoPackage
 Open Geospatial Consortium Web Services:  Web Feature Service, Web Map Service, Catalog Service for the Web
 Web Base Maps: Bing, OpenStreetMap (OSM)

Historical Notes 
With MapInfo Professional, the Sydney Organising Committee for the Olympic Games (SOCOG) created hundreds of maps for the longest torch relay in the history of the modern games. The Olympic Torch Relay covered 26,940 kilometres (16,740 miles) in 100 days and traversed Australia by road, railway and boat. The torch route was designed to ensure that more than 85 percent of the Australian population was within a one-hour drive of the chosen route, which passed through 1,000 towns. In addition, TNT Express used MapInfo to map more than 5,500 delivery routes to deliver Olympic tickets to more than 400,000 Australian homes.

See also 
 MapBasic
 MapInfo TAB format
 List of GIS software

References

External links 
 
 Pitney Bowes Software's MapInfo Professional Support Page
 LI360, MapInfo user community
 Review: Mapping the world with GIS wares
 MapInfo Discussion List
 Directions Magazine review of MapInfo Professional v11

GIS software